The Eighteenth Wisconsin Legislature convened from January 11, 1865, to April 10, 1865, in regular session.

Senators representing even-numbered districts were newly elected for this session and were serving the first year of a two-year term. Assembly members were elected to a one-year term. Assembly members and even-numbered senators were elected in the general election of November 8, 1864. Senators representing odd-numbered districts were serving the second year of their two-year term, having been elected in the general election held on November 3, 1863.

Major events
 January 31, 1865: The United States House of Representatives passed the Thirteenth Amendment to the United States Constitution, banning slavery in the United States.
 March 4, 1865: Second inauguration of President Abraham Lincoln.
 April 3, 1865: Union Army forces occupied the Confederate capital city Richmond, Virginia, after a months-long siege.
 April 9, 1865: Confederate General Robert E. Lee surrendered the Army of Northern Virginia to General Ulysses S. Grant at Appomattox Court House, Virginia.
 April 14, 1865: President Abraham Lincoln was assassinated in Washington, D.C.  
 April 15, 1865: Vice President Andrew Johnson was sworn in as the 17th President of the United States.
 May 10, 1865: Confederate States President Jefferson Davis was captured by the 4th Michigan Cavalry Regiment in Irwin County, Georgia, effectively ending the American Civil War.
 November 7, 1865: Lucius Fairchild elected Governor of Wisconsin.
 December 6, 1865: Thirteenth Amendment to the United States Constitution was ratified by the required three-fourths of U.S. states.

Major legislation
 February 7, 1865: Act to incorporate the Wisconsin soldiers' home, 1865 Act 16
 February 24, 1865: Joint Resolution ratifying proposed amendment to the Constitution of the United States, 1865 Joint Resolution 5

Party summary

Senate summary

Assembly summary

Sessions
 1st Regular session: January 11, 1865April 10, 1865

Leaders

Senate leadership
 President of the Senate: Wyman Spooner
 President pro tempore: Willard H. Chandler

Assembly leadership
 Speaker of the Assembly: William W. Field

Members

Members of the Senate
Members of the Wisconsin Senate for the Eighteenth Wisconsin Legislature:

Members of the Assembly
Members of the Assembly for the Eighteenth Wisconsin Legislature:

Employees

Senate employees
 Chief Clerk: Frank M. Stewart
 Assistant Clerk: L. B. Hills
 Bookkeeper: S. Hauxhurst
 Engrossing Clerk: O. F. Clapp
 Enrolling Clerk: Thomas Marshall
 Transcribing Clerk: H. Harvey
 Sergeant-at-Arms: Nelson Williams
 1st Assistant Sergeant-at-Arms: James L. Wilder
 2nd Assistant Sergeant-at-Arms: D. W. C. Wilson
 Sergeant-at-Arms' Porter: Thomas Goss
 Postmaster: Frank Leland
 Assistant Postmaster: W. S. Williams
 Doorkeeper: J. P. Miller
 Assistant Doorkeeper: George D. Potter
 Assistant Doorkeeper: S. J. Abbott
 Assistant Doorkeeper: Eames Wadsworth
 Assistant Doorkeeper: Norman McBeath
 Assistant Doorkeeper: August Wandrey
 Firemen:
 James Yates
 Roswell Stow
 Fireman and Porter: William Holden
 Messengers:
 Jonathan C. Hutchins
 Rufus H. Roys
 C. C. Frey
 Thomas Goss
 Seymour Stoughton

Assembly employees
 Chief Clerk: John S. Dean
 Assistant Clerk: Ephraim W. Young
 Bookkeeper: William M. Newcomb
 Engrossing Clerk: L. R. Davis
 Enrolling Clerk: J. H. Balch
 Transcribing Clerk: R. H. Blodgett
 Sergeant-at-Arms: Alonzo Wilcox
 1st Assistant Sergeant-at-Arms: Lewis M. Hammond
 2nd Assistant Sergeant-at-Arms: E. H. Bartholt
 Postmaster: Hiram Morley
 1st Assistant Postmaster: Hiram Beckwith
 2nd Assistant Postmaster: R. Law
 Doorkeepers: 
 S. Raymond
 M. Colby
 H. H. Helms
 George D. Phinney
 Firemen:
 E. E. Brown
 John Grant
 F. K. Melvin
 Nelson Bowerman
 William Fitzpatrick
 G. A. Foss
 Speaker's Messenger: William P. Beach
 Chief Clerk's Messenger: James E. Dean
 Sergeant-at-Arms' Messenger: Louis Sholes
 Gallery Attendant: S. Nye Jr.
 Messengers:
 George F. Williston
 Frederic A. Frank
 Howard W. Tilton
 Linus S. Webb
 Alfred F. Bishop
 Frank Mason
 Harvey Olin
 Nicholas F. Weber
 John S. Young
 Richard C. Notbohm

References

Notes

External links

1865 in Wisconsin
Wisconsin
Wisconsin legislative sessions